The Norwich AFL Rising Star award is given annually to a standout young player in the Australian Football League. The 1995 medal was won by  player Nick Holland.

Eligibility
Every round, an Australian Football League rising star nomination is given to a standout young player. To be eligible for the award, a player must be under 21 on January 1 of that year, have played 10 or fewer senior games and not been suspended during the season. At the end of the year, one of the 22 nominees is the winner of award.

Nominations

References

Afl Rising Star, 1995
Australian rules football-related lists